Baku Tech! Bakugan is a series in the Bakugan franchise separate from the Bakugan Battle Brawlers series featuring a new cast of characters and a new plot. Each episode is five and a half minutes long, and airs within the show Ohacoro Up on Saturdays at 8:45am on TV Tokyo. The first season was released in 2012, followed by Baku Tech! Bakugan Gachi in 2013, which aired within the show Ohacoro Pop on Saturdays, at 9:00 AM on TV Tokyo.

Baku Tech! Bakugan (season 1): 2012-13

Baku Tech! Bakugan Gachi (season 2): 2013

References

2012 anime television series debuts
Anime television series based on video games
Bakugan
TV Tokyo original programming